Maotanchang, or Maotanchangzhen is a town located in the south of Jin'an District, Lu'an, Anhui. It is at the junction of Huoshan County, Shucheng County and Jin'an District. It has an area of 59.1 square kilometers. There are 18,000 people in Maotanchang. Maotanchang Middle School is located in Maotanchang.

Maotanchang is divided into the following:

 Maotanchang Subdistrict Village
 Bajiaotang Village
 Jinyan Village
 Qingshanyan Village
 Lijiachong Village
 Dongshisun Village
 Dashanzhai Village

Middle school
The Maotanchang Middle School is prized by many parents across China, because of the exigence and work offered to students in preparation of China's national test, the Gaokao. With approximately 80% of local students reaching the required grade in the examination, many families come in to prepare their children: it is estimated that at the end of August, 50,000 people move in the city, before departing as soon as the Gaokao ends.
The school is the main economic force of the city, raising its annual income to 2.45 million USD.
However, some students have criticized the physical punishments of some teachers or the pressure driving certain students to suicide.

References

Towns in Anhui
Jin'an District, Lu'an